Matthew Joseph Wood (born 14 January 1985 in Brighton) is an English former cricketer active in 2007 who played in one first-class match for Marylebone Cricket Club as a righthanded batsman who bowled left arm medium fast pace. He scored six runs and took two wickets.

Notes

1985 births
English cricketers
Marylebone Cricket Club cricketers
Living people
Sportspeople from Brighton
English cricketers of the 21st century